Karl Hecker (8 May 1827 – 14 December 1882) was a German gynecologist and obstetrician born in Berlin. He was the only son of medical historian Justus Hecker (1795–1850).

He studied medicine at the Universities of Berlin, Heidelberg, Paris and Vienna, receiving his doctorate in 1848 from Berlin. In 1851 he became an assistant at the clinic of obstetrics at the Berlin-Charité under Dietrich Wilhelm Heinrich Busch (1788–1858). Here he gained his habilitation in 1853 with a thesis involving retroverted gravid uterus (De retroversione uteri gravidi).

In 1858 he was an associate professor of obstetrics at the University of Marburg, and during the following year accepted an appointment as a gynecologist at the University of Munich. At Munich he was also director of the municipal district maternity hospital and school for midwives. In 1874/75 he served as university rector. From 1877 he worked with Carl Siegmund Franz Credé (1819–1892) and Alfred Hegar (1830–1914) for the creation of an independent gynecological society, but it wasn't until 1885, three years after his death, when the Deutsche Gesellschaft für Gynäkologie was established.

Hecker was a son-in-law to politician Johann Caspar Bluntschli (1808–1881).

Written works 
 Beiträge zur Lehre der Schwangerschaft außerhalb der Gebärmutterhöhle (Contributions on the topic of pregnancy outside the uterus). 1858  
 Klinik der Geburtskunde (Clinic of Obstetrics), 1861; with Ludwig von Buhl (1816–1880)
 Ueber die Schädelform bei Gesichtslagen. 1869
 Ueber den Gesundheitszustand der Wöchnerinnen in der Kreis- und Lokal-Gebäranstalt München (On the health of mothers in the district and local maternity hospital in Munich) 1877
 Beobachtungen und Untersuchungen aus der Gebäranstalt zu München, umfassend den Zeitraum von 1859–1879 (Observations and studies from the maternity hospital in Munich, comprising the period from 1859 to 1879).

References 
 ADB:Hecker, Karl von Wikisource

German obstetricians
German gynaecologists
Physicians from Berlin
Academic staff of the Ludwig Maximilian University of Munich
1827 births
1882 deaths
Academic staff of the University of Marburg